The 1990 United States elections were held on November 6 and elected the members of the 102nd United States Congress. The elections occurred in the middle of Republican President George H. W. Bush's term and during the Gulf War. The Democratic Party easily retained control of Congress 

The Democratic Party built on its majorities in both chambers of Congress. They picked up a net of one seat in the Senate. Democrats won the nationwide popular vote for the House of Representatives by a margin of 7.8 point percentage points, picking up a net of seven seats. In the gubernatorial elections, both parties lost a net of one seat to third parties.

The Democratic performance was underwhelming, but a wave wasn't needed due to the party already having solid control of Congress.

Federal elections

Senate elections

The 1990 Senate elections featured the smallest number of seats changing parties in US history since the passage of the Seventeenth Amendment in 1913 with only one seat changing parties. That election featured Democrat Paul Wellstone defeating incumbent Republican Rudy Boschwitz in Minnesota.

House of Representatives elections

Democrats won the nationwide popular vote for the House of Representatives by a margin of 7.8 percentage points, picking up a net of seven seats.

State elections

Heading into the elections, there were 20 seats held by Democrats and 16 held by Republicans. By the end of the elections, 19 seats would be held by a Democrat, 15 would be held by a Republican, and two would be held by other parties.

Notably in these elections, there were two people elected from a third party: a former Alaskan governor and Secretary of the Interior, Joseph Hickel, was elected governor as a part of the Alaskan Independence Party, and former U.S. Senator Lowell Weicker of Connecticut won on A Connecticut Party's ticket. In addition to Weicker, two other U.S. senators were elected governors that year: Republican Pete Wilson of California and Democrat Lawton Chiles of Florida. The 1990 cycle saw six incumbent governors defeated. These were Republicans Mike Hayden of Kansas, Kay Orr of Nebraska, Bob Martinez of Florida and Edward DiPrete of Rhode Island, as well as Democrats James Blanchard of Michigan and Rudy Perpich of Minnesota.

References

 
1990
United States midterm elections
November 1990 events in the United States